La herencia may refer to:

La herencia (1962 TV series), a Mexican telenovela by Televisa
La herencia (1964 film), an Argentine film
La herencia (2015 film), a Peruvian comedy film directed by Gastón Vizcarra
La herencia (2022 TV series), a Mexican telenovela by TelevisaUnivision

See also
 Herencia (disambiguation)